Donghuamen Night Market was a night market located in the northern end of Wangfujing in Beijing, China.  Dong Hua Men is written 东华门, the name of the East Gate of the Forbidden City.

Description
One can find a row of unusual food stalls. An array of Chinese food delicacies are on display with people bustling around to experience some new tastes. Items such as sheep's particular parts, offal soup, deep fried crickets, centipedes, silk worms, scorpions and lizards are available to eat on a stick. There are also the more widely recognised Western foods such as spring rolls, dumplings, crab cakes and candy fruit. All stalls display their food selections in both Chinese (Mandarin) and English. The food was displayed raw and can be deep fried in a large Wok upon request.

Closure
Due to hygiene and noise complaints, the Donghuamen market closed on 24 June 2016.

See also 

 Wangfujing

References

External links 
 "Donghuamen Night Market" - Beijing Guide
 Taylor, Scott, "Beijing paradise for bravest of diners", Deseret News (Salt Lake City), Aug 23, 2008 
 Zimmern, Andrew, "Andrew Zimmern's Guide to Beijing", Bizarre Foods with Andrew Zimmern, Travel Channel
 "Dong Hua Men Night Market", TripAdvisor
 "Photo Essay on Beijing's Dong Hua Men Night Market" - Heso magazine

Dongcheng District, Beijing
Night markets
Retail markets in China
Tourist attractions in Beijing